Castell means 'Castle' both in Catalan and Welsh.

Castell may also refer to:

Places

Germany
Castell, Bavaria, a town in the district of Kitzingen, Bavaria, Germany
County of Castell, a former county of northern Bavaria, Germany

Spain
Es Castell, in Minorca, Spain
Castell-Platja d'Aro, municipality in Baix Empordà
Castell de Cabres, municipality in Baix Maestrat
Castell de Castells, municipality in Marina Alta
El Castell de Guadalest, or simply Guadalest, municipality in Marina Baixa
Castell de l'Areny, municipality in Berguedà
Castell de Mur, municipality in Pallars Jussà

United States
Castell, Texas, a small community

Wales
Castell, Denbighshire, a village

Other uses
 Castell (surname)
 Castell, a human tower built at festivals in Catalonia and the Valencian Community
 Castell's sign, a medical sign assessed to evaluate splenomegaly and typically part of an abdominal examination
 Castell, a fictional planet in the Star Wars franchise

See also
Castel (disambiguation)
Castella (disambiguation)
Castelli (disambiguation)
Castello (disambiguation)
Castells (disambiguation)
Castile (disambiguation)
Castillo (disambiguation)
Castle (disambiguation)